Mosquito Mountain is a mountain range in Washoe County, Nevada and Lake County, Oregon.

References 

Mountain ranges of Nevada
Mountain ranges of Oregon
Mountain ranges of Washoe County, Nevada
Mountain ranges of Lake County, Oregon